George Deyes (11 February 1879 – 11 January 1963) was an English first-class cricketer, who played seventeen matches for Yorkshire County Cricket Club between 1905 and 1907.

Born in Southcoates, Hull, East Riding of Yorkshire, Deyes was a right arm fast bowler, who took 41 wickets at an average of 23.02.  He had a best of 6 for 62 against Ireland, and took 5 for 75 in a County Championship game against Somerset. A right-handed tail-ender, he scored 44 runs at 2.20, with a first-class career best innings score of 12.

He also played for the Yorkshire Second XI (1903–1907) and Staffordshire (1910–1913).

Deyes died in January 1963 in Tipperlinn, Edinburgh, Midlothian.

References

External links
Cricinfo Profile

Yorkshire cricketers
Cricketers from Kingston upon Hull
1879 births
1963 deaths
English cricketers
Staffordshire cricketers
English cricketers of 1890 to 1918